The Sabana Grande Formation is a geologic formation in western Puerto Rico. The conglomerates and limestones of the formation preserve gastropod fossils of Trochactaeon woodsi dating back to the Late Campanian period.

See also 
 List of fossiliferous stratigraphic units in Puerto Rico

References

Further reading 
 N. F. Sohl and H. A. Kollmann. 1985. Cretaceous Actaeonellid Gastropods from the Western Hemisphere. United States Geological Survey Professional Paper 1304:1-104

Geologic formations of Puerto Rico
Cretaceous Puerto Rico
Campanian Stage
Conglomerate formations
Limestone formations